Pleiodon may refer to:
 Pleiodon, a genus of grasses currently considered to be a synonym of Bouteloua
 Pleiodon (bivalve), a genus within the family Iridinidae